The 2018 Major League Soccer season was the 23rd season of Major League Soccer, top division of soccer in the United States and Canada. The regular season began on March 3, 2018 and concluded on October 28, 2018. The MLS Cup Playoffs began on October 31, 2018 and concluded with MLS Cup 2018 on December 8, 2018. The league took a nine-day hiatus in early June for the 2018 FIFA World Cup, reduced from previous breaks.

Los Angeles FC joined the league as an expansion franchise, while D.C. United debuted their new soccer-specific stadium, Audi Field.

Toronto FC were the defending Supporters' Shield champions and defending MLS Cup champions.

New York Red Bulls won their third Supporters' Shield, with a league record 71 points, while Atlanta United FC won their first MLS Cup in their second year in the league.

Teams

Stadiums and locations

Personnel and sponsorship

Note: All teams use Adidas as kit manufacturer.

Coaching changes

Regular season

Format 
During the 2018 MLS regular season, each team played 34 games, including 17 home games and 17 away games. Teams faced each of their conference opponents (10 in the East, 11 in the West) twice during the season with one game at home and one game away. Western Conference teams played one additional intra-conference game and Eastern Conference teams played two. All teams faced each non-conference opponent once.

Conference standings

Eastern Conference

Western Conference

Overall table

Aggregate 2017 and 2018 table

Playoffs

Bracket

Knockout round

Conference semifinals

Conference finals

MLS Cup

Attendance

Average home attendances

Ranked from highest to lowest average attendance.

Highest attendances 

Regular season

Player statistics

Goals

Assists

Shutouts

Hat-tricks

Awards

Player of the Month

Player and team of the week
 Bold denotes league player of the week.
 Italics denotes Audi player performance of the week.

Goal of the Week

End-of-season awards

MLS Best XI

Player transfers

SuperDraft

The MLS SuperDraft is an annual event, taking place in January of each year, in which the teams of Major League Soccer select players who have graduated from college or otherwise been signed by the league. The first two rounds of 2018 MLS SuperDraft were held on January 19 in Philadelphia. Rounds three and four of the 2018 SuperDraft were held via conference call on January 21. Los Angeles FC selected João Moutinho with the first overall pick.

Allocation ranking
The allocation ranking is the mechanism used to determine which MLS club has first priority to acquire a player who is in the MLS allocation list. The MLS allocation list contains select U.S. National Team players and players transferred outside of MLS garnering a transfer fee of at least $500,000. The allocations are ranked in reverse order of finish for the 2017 season, taking playoff performance into account. As an expansion team, Los Angeles FC took the top spot.

Once the club uses its allocation ranking to acquire a player, it drops to the bottom of the list. A ranking can be traded provided that part of the compensation received in return is another club's ranking. At all times each club is assigned one ranking. The rankings reset at the end of each MLS season.

References

External links
 

 
2018
1